Glenn Coleman (July 18, 1887 – May 8, 1932) was an American painter. His work was part of the painting event in the art competition at the 1932 Summer Olympics. Coleman's Still Life was shown at the Whitney Studio Club's twelfth annual exhibit of painting and sculpture.

Coleman was born in Springfield, Ohio on July 18, 1887, or 1881 and grew up in Indianapolis, Indiana. In Indianapolis, he studied at an art school. In 1905, he moved to New York and attended the New York School of Art. There, he studied under artists Robert Henri and Everett Shinn. Coleman's work focused on New York City and its street life, often painted in a simplistic style; in later years, his painting style was inspired by Cubism.

References

1887 births
1932 deaths
20th-century American painters
American male painters
Olympic competitors in art competitions
People from Springfield, Ohio
20th-century American male artists